Felimare tema is a species of sea slug or dorid nudibranch, a marine gastropod mollusc in the family Chromodorididae.

Distribution 
It has been reported from Senegal, Equatorial Guinea and Cape Verde.

Description
Felimare tema is similar in appearance to Felimare picta but with a dark blackish green background colour and with a broad orange border to the mantle, interrupted by violet areas. DNA evidence shows it is clearly a distinct species from Felimare picta, but probably synonymous with Felimare verdensis.

References

Chromodorididae
Gastropods described in 1981